California's 18th congressional district is a congressional district located in the U.S. state of California. Since the 2022 election, the district is landlocked and includes the Salinas Valley and downtown and eastern San Jose.

Due to the presence of Silicon Valley, the district had a median household income of $149,375, the second highest of any congressional district in the country. After redistricting, the district picked up agricultural areas of Monterey County, and its median household income dropped substantially, to $90,456.

Redistricting

2020 redistricting
Following the 2020 census and the subsequent 2020 United States redistricting cycle, California lost a congressional district, leading to significant changes across California's districts. Most of the area previously part of the 18th district was split into the new 16th district and 19th district. The 18th district was moved to cover the Salinas Valley in Monterey County and the downtown and east side of San Jose. With the changes, the 18th became a Latino majority district.

2010 redistricting
Following the 2010 census and the subsequent 2010 United States redistricting cycle, California's 18th congressional district was redrawn by the California Citizens Redistricting Commission. Cities and CDPs in the district include Palo Alto, Stanford, Los Altos, Woodside, Mountain View, Los Altos Hills, Campbell, Saratoga, Los Gatos, and Scotts Valley; most of Menlo Park and Redwood City; and part of San Jose.

2000 redistricting
Following the 2000 census and the subsequent 2000 United States redistricting cycle, California's congressional districts were redrawn by the California State Legislature. From 2003 to 2013, the district was located in the San Joaquin Valley. It included Merced County and portions of San Joaquin, Stanislaus, Madera, and Fresno counties. Cities in the district included Modesto, most of Stockton, Ceres, Atwater, Merced, and Los Banos.

Recent election results from statewide races

Election results from statewide races before 2012

Composition

As of the 2020 redistricting, California's 18th congressional district was shifted geographically to cover the Salinas Valley. It encompasses San Benito, the southernmost point of Santa Cruz County, and the interiors of Santa Clara and Monterey Counties.

Santa Cruz County is split between this district and the 19th district. They are partitioned by Pajaro River, Highway 129, W Beach St, Lee Rd, Highway 1, Harkins Slough Rd, Harkins Slough, Old Adobe Rd, Corralitos Creek, Varin Rd, Pioneer Rd, Green Valley Rd, Casserly Rd, Mt Madonna Rd. The 18th district takes in the city of Watsonville.

Santa Clara County is split between this district, the 19th district, the 16th district, and the 17th district. The 18th, 16th, and 19th are partitioned by Bella Vista Ln, Bodfish Creek, Burchell Rd, Bluebell Dr, Day Rd, Highway G8, W San Martin Ave, Santa Teresa Blvd, Sunnyside Ave, Morgan Hill City Limits, Hale Ave, Tilton Ave, Monterey Rd, Highway 101, Coyote Rd, Anderson Lake, Las Animas Rd, Metcalf Rd, Yerba Buena Creek, Old Yerba Buena Rd, Aborn Rd, Quincy Rd, Norwood Ave, Murillo Ave, Pleasant Acres Dr, Westview Dr, Pleasant Knoll Dr, Guluzzo Dr, Flint Ave, Marten Ave, Coldwater Dr, Ocala Ave, Wonderama Dr, Cunningham Ave, Swift Ave, Highway 101, Story Rd, Monterey Rd, Highway 87, Highway 280, Highway 880. The 18th and 17th are partitioned by Steven’s Creek Blvd, Di Salvo Ave, Bellerose Dr, Forest Ave, Wabash Ave, W San Carlos St, Race St, The Alameda, University Ave, Elm St, Highway 82, Newhall St, Morse St, Idaho St, Alameda Ct, Sherwood Ave, Hamline St, Highway 880, Highway 101, McKee Rd, Toyon Ave, Penitencia Creek Rd, Canon Vista Ave, Crothers Rd, Alum Rock Park, Sierra Rd, Felter Rd, Weller Rd. The 18th district takes in the center of the city of San Jose and the San Jose district of Alum Rock. It also takes in the cities of Morgan Hill and Gilroy.

Monterey County is split between this district and the 19th district. They are partitioned by Union Pacific, Highway G12, Elkhorn Rd, Echo Valley Rd, Maher Rd, Maher Ct, La Encina Dr, Crazy Horse Canyon Rd, San Juan Grade Rd, Highway 101, Espinosa Rd, Castroville Blvd, Highway 156, Highway 1, Tembladero Slough, Highway 183, Cooper Rd, Blanco Rd, Salinas River, Davis Rd, Hitchcock Rd, Highway 68, E Blanco Rd, Nutting St, Abbott St, Highway G17, Limekiln Creek, Likekiln Rd, Rana Creek, Tularcitos Creek, Highway G16, Tassajara Rd, Camp Creek, Lost Valley Creek, Lost Valley Conn, N Coast Rdg, 2 Central Coa, Cone Peak Rd, Nacimiento Fergusson Rd, Los Bueyes Creek, and the Monterey County Southern border. The 18th district takes in the cities of Salinas, Soledad, Greenfield, King City, and the north side of the census-designated place Prunedale.

Cities & CDP with 10,000 or more people
 San Jose - 1,013,240
 Salinas - 163,542
 Gilroy - 56,766
 Watsonville - 52,590
 Morgan Hill - 44,686
 Hollister - 41,678
 Soledad - 25,999
 Prunedale - 20,560
 Greenfield - 17,516
 King City - 14,077

List of members representing the district

Election results

1932

1934

1936

1938

1940

1942

1944

1946

1948

1950

1952

1954

1956

1958

1960

1962

1964

1966

1968

1970

1972

1974

1976

1978

1980

1982

1984

1986

1988

1990

1992

1994

1996

1998

2000

2002

2004

2006

2008

2010

2012

2014

2016

2018

2020

See also
List of United States congressional districts

References

External links
GovTrack.us: California's 18th congressional district
RAND California Election Returns: District Definitions
California Voter Foundation map - CD18

18
Government of San Mateo County, California
Government of Santa Clara County, California
Santa Cruz Mountains
Silicon Valley
Congressional District 18
Los Gatos, California
Mountain View, California
Palo Alto, California
Portola Valley, California
Redwood City, California
Sunnyvale, California
San Jose, California
Woodside, California
Constituencies established in 1933
Congressional District 18
Congressional District 18